We Are All Small Pixels is the second studio album by Norwegian jazz band Pixel. True to the band's style, it mixes challenging jazz compositions and horn arrangements with approachable and "hummamble" choruses.

Track listing

Personnel
 Ellen Andrea Wang – Composer,  Double Bass,  Vocals
 Jon Audun Baar – Composer,  Drums,  Percussion
 Harald Lassen – Composer,  Sax (Soprano),  Sax (Tenor)
 Jonas Kilmork Vemøy – Composer,  Trumpet
 Jacob Dobewall – Assistant Engineer
 Mike Hartung – Engineer,  Mixing Engineer
 Morgan Nicolaysen – Mastering
 Solveig Selj – Band Photo,  Cover Photo

References

2013 albums